The Doug Fir Lounge is a bar and restaurant housed within the ground level of the Jupiter Hotel, in Portland, Oregon's Buckman neighborhood, in the United States.

Description and history 
The venue was established in 2004 and features a basement music and event space.

In 2023, the venue is slated to relocate to the space which previously housed Le Bistro Montage.

Reception
Doug Fir Lounge won in the "Best Music Venue" category of Willamette Week "Best of Portland Readers' Poll 2020".

References

External links

 
 

2004 establishments in Oregon
Buckman, Portland, Oregon
Event venues in Oregon
Music venues in Portland, Oregon
Restaurants in Portland, Oregon
Restaurants established in 2004